Sri Rama and Bhaktha Gentela Narayana Rao Government Degree College in short SR&BGNR Degree College is the major degree college in Khammam, Telangana offering Degree and Post graduate courses. It is affiliated to Kakatiya University.

History
Established in 1956, it acted as a major graduation place for the entire district of Khammam.

Before taking the decision of establishing this college, the government said there is a lack of funds for land acquisition and building the college. Then a committee said as it is degree college for Khammam District, to raise money go for auction of ornaments of Badhradri Rama which were made by Baktha Ramadasu.

Baktha Gentela Narayana Rao is a strong worshipper of Lord Sri Rama. This decision made him sorrow and said do not go for auction, I will give my 200 acres land surrounded by Wyra Road and Yellandu road to the government for building Govt. Degree College. Later the land is utilized for building District Court and its Quarters, Stadium, University PG College, Medicinal Park, etc..

Sports
The college campus ground was given away for the construction of Sardar Patel Stadium. This ground hosts major inter district and inter state sports events. The college organises various leadership programs under National Service Scheme(NSS).

Archaeological research
The history department has made significant research in major megalithic sites around Khammam District. Some of the artifacts were hosted in the college. There was also a proposal to construct a museum. Prof KP Rao of University of Hyderabad has guided the research team to excavate Megalithic pottery.

See also 
Education in India
Literacy in India
List of institutions of higher education in Telangana

References

External links

Arts colleges in India
Commerce colleges in India
Education in Khammam district
Educational institutions established in 1956
1956 establishments in Andhra Pradesh